Fodinoidea formosa is a moth of the family Erebidae. It was described by Hervé de Toulgoët in 1984. It is found on Madagascar.

References

 

Spilosomina
Moths described in 1984